Robert Somervell (18 May 1892 – 8 June 1967) was a New Zealand cricketer. He played eight first-class matches for Auckland between 1911 and 1922.

Somervell was a batsman. He toured Australia with the New Zealand team in 1913-14, but made a pair in the only first-class match he played on the tour. His highest first-class score was 74 not out for Auckland against Hawke's Bay in 1912–13.

Somervell married Lulu Bates in the Auckland suburb of Devonport in March 1918.

See also
 List of Auckland representative cricketers

References

External links
 

1892 births
1967 deaths
New Zealand cricketers
Pre-1930 New Zealand representative cricketers
Auckland cricketers
Cricketers from Auckland